Maiden Lane is a pedestrian mall located in San Francisco, California, United States. A former section of the city's red light district, Maiden Lane is now home to high-end boutiques and art galleries. The street also serves as the location of San Francisco's only Frank Lloyd Wright designed building.

History

Prior to the 1906 earthquake, the street was called Morton Street and was the center of San Francisco's red-light district. Historically, the street reported one murder a week. The earthquake, which leveled much of the city, rendered this two-block stretch rubble, and the brothels were destroyed. It was renamed Maiden Lane by an enterprising jeweler who wanted to conjure the Maiden Lanes of London and New York. In 1955, on the initiative of local merchants, cars were prohibited from the lane during certain times of day, an unusual measure at the time.

In 1958, Jane Jacobs described the street, in an essay that was later characterized as a "spirited rebuttal to the antiseptic urban renewal that was gospel at the time":
In 1961, the San Francisco Chronicle's columnist Herb Caen praised Maiden Lane as "a busy little block of intriguing shops."

Today

Today, the street is a pedestrian mall lined with boutiques. The pedestrian mall stretches two blocks, between Kearny and Stockton Streets. The street is blocked from traffic from 11 am until 5 pm by wrought iron gates, reopening in the evening to traffic. The most notable building on the street is the V. C. Morris Gift Shop, which is a San Francisco Designated Landmark. The building is the only Frank Lloyd Wright designed space in the city.

In 2016, the Chronicle's urban design critic John King revisited Jacobs' 1958 essay and found that much of it no longer applied: "Maiden Lane feels mighty generic these days [...] posh but pallid, a testament to the dangers of prosperity when it has more to do with the global scene than the local one."

References

Pedestrian malls in the United States
Streets in San Francisco
Union Square, San Francisco